No Love Lost is the debut album by English indie rock band The Rifles, which was released on 17 July 2006. The album reached number 26 on the UK charts.

The album spawned five singles: "Peace & Quiet", "When I'm Alone", "Local Boy", "Repeated Offender", and "She's Got Standards".

On 1 June 2015, No Love Lost was digitally remastered at Abbey Road Studios and re-released as part of the 10th anniversary of the album. The re-release featured b-sides and demos from the recording of the original album.

Track listing

 The last track contains a hidden track called "Fat Cat".

Bonus tracks on the enhanced version

Personnel
Engineer - Jon Gray
Mixing - Ian Broudie, Steve Harris

References

See also
The Rifles

2006 debut albums
The Rifles (band) albums
Albums produced by Ian Broudie